John Harvey Gordon (15 June 1886 – 23 April 1933) was an English cricketer. Gordon was a right-handed batsman whose bowling style is unknown. He played most of his first-class cricket for Oxford University, but also played county cricket for Surrey (at first-class level) and Dorset.

Career
Born at Reigate, Surrey, Gordon was educated at Winchester College, where he represented the school cricket team, then went on to study at Magdalen College, Oxford. He made his debut in first-class cricket for the University Cricket Club against HDG Leveson-Gower's XI at the University Parks in 1906. Gordon made eight further first-class appearances for the University in that season, scoring 545 runs at an average of 27.35, with a high score of 117, his only first-class century, which came against Surrey. He also made two first-class appearances for Surrey in that season's County Championship against Warwickshire and Worcestershire. He continued to play for Oxford University in 1907, making a further nine first-class appearances for the team, though he was less successful, scoring 251 runs at an average of 13.94, with a high score of 51. In his 18 first-class appearances for the University, Gordon scored 678 runs at an average of 19.94. He also made a single appearance for Surrey in that season's County Championship against Nottinghamshire at Trent Bridge. The following season he played minor counties cricket for Dorset, making a single appearance in the Minor Counties Championship against Berkshire.

He later emigrated to the United States, playing for Merion Cricket Club in the Halifax Cup from 1911–14. He died on 23 April 1933, at Charlottesville, Virginia.

References

External links
John Gordon at ESPNcricinfo
John Gordon at CricketArchive

1886 births
1933 deaths
People from Reigate
People educated at Winchester College
Alumni of Magdalen College, Oxford
English cricketers
Oxford University cricketers
Surrey cricketers
Dorset cricketers
British emigrants to the United States